The Duff, later Duff Gordon Baronetcy, of Halkin in the County of Aberdeen, is a title in the Baronetage of the United Kingdom. It was created on 12 November 1813 for James Duff, British Consul in Cádiz, with remainder to his nephew, William Gordon. Duff died unmarried in 1815 and was succeeded according to the special remainder by his nephew, the second Baronet, who assumed the additional surname of Duff on succeeding to the title. He was the second son of Lord Rockville, fourth son of the 2nd Earl of Aberdeen. Duff Gordon sat as Member of Parliament for Worcester.

Lucy, Lady Duff-Gordon, wife of the fifth Baronet, was a leading fashion designer; and, together with her sister Elinor Glyn, was one of the original 'It' girls.

Duff, later Duff Gordon baronets, of Halkin (1813)
Sir James Duff, 1st Baronet (1734–1815)
Sir William Duff-Gordon, 2nd Baronet (1772–1823)
Sir Alexander Cornewall Duff-Gordon, 3rd Baronet (1811–1872)
Sir Maurice Duff-Gordon, 4th Baronet (1849–1896)
Sir Cosmo Edmund Duff-Gordon, 5th Baronet (1862–1931)
Sir Henry William Duff-Gordon, 6th Baronet (1866–1953)
Sir Douglas Frederick Duff-Gordon, 7th Baronet (1892–1964)
Sir Andrew Cosmo Lewis Duff-Gordon, 8th Baronet (born 1933)

The heir apparent is the present holder's son Cosmo Henry Villiers Duff-Gordon (born 1968).

See also
Marquess of Aberdeen and Temair

References

Kidd, Charles, Williamson, David (editors). Debrett's Peerage and Baronetage (1990 edition). New York: St Martin's Press, 1990.
www.thepeerage.com

Duff-Gordon
Baronetcies created with special remainders